Jerry Harrell Bentley (December 12, 1949 – July 15, 2012) was an American academic and professor of world history. He was a founding editor of the Journal of World History since 1990. He wrote on the cultural history of early modern Europe and on cross-cultural interactions in world history. He was one of the cited experts in Annenberg Media's 2004 series of educational videos that are broadcast by satellite on the Annenberg Channel.

Biography
Bentley was born in Birmingham, Alabama, United States. He attended Brainerd High School in Chattanooga, Tennessee, and then went on to the University of Tennessee where he obtained a bachelor's degree in 1971, and then his Masters (1974) and PhD (1976) from the University of Minnesota. Following this he began working as an assistant professor at the University of Hawaii in 1976. He rose to Associate Professor in 1982, and full professor in 1987.  In 1990 he was the founding editor of the Journal of World History, with Elton Daniel and Daniel Kwok as editorial board members, and Herbert F. Ziegler as the book review editor.  The University released a series of monographs on world history, Perspectives on the Global Past, and then became the headquarters for the World History Association.  Bentley and Ziegler were also co-authors of the college-level world history textbook Traditions and Encounters which as of 2016 is in its 6th edition.

In 2002, Bentley became the Director at the Center for World History at the University of Hawaii.

Awards
 1987, President's Citation for Meritorious Teaching
 1985, Fujio Matsuda Fellow 

Two awards are named for him. The Bentley Book Prize (est. 2012) of the World History Association; and the Jerry Bentley Prize in World History of the American Historical Association (est. 2014).

Death
Bentley died of pancreatic cancer in 2012.

Works
 Journal of World History (editor).
"Erasmus, Jean Le Clerc, and the Principle of the Harder Reading," Renaissance Quarterly 31, no. 3 (Autumn, 1978), pp. 309–321.
 Humanists and Holy Writ: New Testament Scholarship in the Renaissance (Princeton: Princeton University Press, 1983).
 Politics and Culture in Renaissance Naples (Princeton: Princeton University Press, 1987).
 Old World Encounters: Cross-Cultural Contacts and Exchanges in Pre-Modern Times (New York: Oxford University Press, 1993).
 (with Herbert F. Ziegler) Traditions and Encounters: A Global Perspective on the Past (Boston: McGraw-Hill, 2000); second edition (Boston: McGraw-Hill, 2003).
 "Cross-Cultural Interaction and Periodization in World History," American Historical Review 101 (1996): 749–70.
 "Hemispheric Integration, 500–1500 C.E.," Journal of World History 9 (1998): 237–54
 "World History," in D.R. Woolf, ed., Making History: A Global Encyclopedia of Historical Writing (New York: Garland, 1998), pp. 968–70.
 "Sea and Ocean Basins as Frameworks of Historical Analysis," The Geographical Review 89 (1999): 215–24.
 "Shapes of World History in Twentieth-Century Scholarship," in Michael P. Adas, ed., Agricultural and Pastoral Societies in Ancient and Classical History (Philadelphia: Temple University Press, 2001), pp. 3–35.
 "The New World History," in Lloyd Kramer and Sarah Maza, eds., A Companion to Western Historical Thought (Oxford: Blackwell, 2002), pp. 393–416.
 "World History and Grand Narrative," in Benedikt Stuchtey, ed., Writing World History, 1800–2000 (Oxford: Oxford University Press, 2003), pp. xx–xx.
 "Why Study World History?," in World History Connected 5:1(2007), 19 pars.
 "Europeanization of the World or Globalization of Europe?" Religions 3, no. 2 (2012): 441–454.

Notes

References
 University of Hawaii Press
 Profile at mcgraw-hill.com
 Profile at History Compass

1949 births
2012 deaths
University of Minnesota alumni
University of Hawaiʻi faculty
Writers from Birmingham, Alabama
Deaths from pancreatic cancer
American historians
World historians